Rubaboo is a common stew or porridge consumed by coureurs des bois and voyageurs (French fur traders) and Métis people of North America. This dish is traditionally made of peas and/ or corn, with grease (bear or pork) and a thickening agent (bread or flour) that makes up the base of the stew. Pemmican and maple sugar were also commonly added to the mixture. Rubaboo that is made by the Plains Metis is often made with pemmican, rabbit, prairie chicken or sage hen and a wide variety of wild vegetables such as wild parsnip (lii naavoo) onion, turnip, and asparagus that can all be added to the food with preference. The thickened mixture was later re-served as “rowschow” (re-chaud). Sometimes, It is occasionally spelled Rubbaboo. Other sources describe it as consisting primarily of boiled pemmican, with thickening agents added when available.

Origins 
The etymology of the word is a blend of the French word roux (a thickener used in gravies and sauces) with the word for soup ("aboo") from an Algonquian language, such as Anishnaabe naboo. Although pemmican can be added to the stew, Rubaboo and pemmican remain separate dishes, but are culturally linked closely to each other in Metis history.

See also

 Métis
 Métis in Canada
 Kama (food)
 List of porridges
 List of stews
 Roux
 Coureur des bois

Sources 
 Arts, A. A. (2009, January 1). About Us. Retrieved 22 November 2019 from http://albertaaboriginalarts.ca/
 Barkwell, Lawrence J.; Dorion, Leah; Hourie, Audreen (2006). Métis Legacy (Volume II) Michif Culture, Heritage, and Folkways. Winnipeg: Pemmican Publications Inc. and Saskatoon: Gabriel Dumont Institute. .
 Gordon, Irene Ternier (1 February 2011). A People on the Move: The Métis of the Western Plains. Heritage House Publishing Co. p. 20  Retrieved 21 November 2019.
 Weaver, S. M., Brockway, R. W., & Blue, A. W. (1982). Book Reviews. Canadian Journal of Native Studies, Vol. 2, Pp. 395–414., Vol. 2, 395–414.Retrieved 22 November 2019 from https://iportal.usask.ca/index.php?t=display_solr_search&having=4303766&sid=168308311
 PEMMICAN.(1961). Nutrition Reviews, 19(3), 73–75. Retrieved 23 November 2019 from https://academic.oup.com/nutritionreviews/article-abstract/19/3/73/2672002?redirectedFrom=fulltext

References

Indigenous cuisine in Canada
Porridges
Métis culture
Native American cuisine
Fur trade